The qualifying competitions for the 2017 CONCACAF U-20 Championship were handled by two regional of CONCACAF's bodies; the Caribbean Football Union (Caribbean zone) and the Central American Football Union (Central American zone).

Representative teams from Canada, Mexico and the United States automatically qualified for the final competition.

Caribbean zone

The details were announced in April 2016.

Teams

First round

Group 1
To be held 15–19 June 2016 and hosted in St. Maarten.

Group 2
To be held 15–19 June 2016 and hosted in Trinidad and Tobago.

Group 3
To be held 29 June – 3 July 2016 and hosted in Haiti.

Group 4
To be held 15–19 June 2016 and hosted in Dominican Republic.

Ranking of second-placed teams
Three runners-up from the group stage (best three group runners-up) will also qualify for the final round.

Final round
To be held 21–30 October 2016 and hosted in Curaçao.

Group stage

Group A

Group B

Ranking of third-placed teams
The best third-placed team from the final round group stage also qualified for the 2017 CONCACAF U-20 Championship.

Knockout stage

Semi-finals

Third-place playoff

Final

Awards
Golden Boot of Finals
 Ronaldo Damus (6 goals)
MVP
 Roberto Louima
Golden Glove
 Jhon Paris
Golden Boot of Tournaments
 Ronaldo Damus (8 goals)
 Roberto Louima (8 goals)
 Nicholas Dillon (8 goals)

Goalscorers
8 goals

 Ronaldo Damus
 Roberto Louima
 Nicholas Dillon

6 goals

 Javorn Stevens
 Tahir Hanley

4 goals

 Kenley Dede

3 goals

 Jaz Ratteray Smith
 Tehvan Tyrell
 Yvann Macon
 Shamar Nicholson
 Jeimax Osorio
 Isaiah Hudson

2 goals

 Denie Henry
 Luther Wildin
 Zayn Hakeem
 Liam Evans
 Knory Scott
 Mazhyze Burchall
 Lazaro Yasmani
 Yoan Godinez
 Alejandro Morejon
 Manny Rodríguez
 Víctor Polanco
 Stevenson Guillaume
 Jonel Désiré
 Javier De la Rosa
 Carmelo Carrillo
 Javier Sutton
 Delano Hodge
 Noah Powder

1 goal

 Tyrique Lake
 Jermaine Browne
 Vashami Allen
 Matthew Hall
 Paul Douglas
 Jahnaze Swan
 Osagi Bascome
 Ahkari Furbert
 Mikiel Thomas
 Zachary Scott
 Sebastìan Martinez
 Michael Martin Scott
 Leighton Thomas
 Luis Diaz
 Eduard Puga
 Lazano Tuero
 Darien Guerra
 Leery Schores
 Jeremy Cijntje
 Zion Lander
 Fitz Jolly
 Dillon Augustine
 Arismendy Jiménez
 Erick Japa
 Giovanni Dupalan
 Dimitri Bolivar
 Leverton Pierre
 Odilon Jerome
 Miche Chery
 Jean Jean Francois
 Jimmy-Shammar Sanon
 Nathaniel Adamolekun
 José Rodríguez
 Andre Rivera
 Juan O'Neill
 Nicolás Cardona
 Steve Archibald
 Dakarai Phipps
 Antoine Wilfred
 Nyrone Winter
 Ryi Maryat
 Cassius Joseph
 Keeroy Lionel
 Jarred Dass
 Kierron Mason
 Micah Lasiquot
 Morgan Brouce-de-Rouche
 Josh Toussaint

Own goals

 Keanu Richardson (against Trinidad)
 Ronald Aranda (against Saint Lucia)

Central American zone

The format is a single round-robin stage. Costa Rica qualified for the CONCACAF U-20 Championship as hosts and did not enter the qualifying competition. Belize withdrew. Guatemala were prevented from entering the 2017 CONCACAF U-20 Championship due to FIFA suspending National Football Federation of Guatemala. Fourth place Panama qualified in their place.

References

External links
Under 20s – Men, CONCACAF.com
Fútbol Masculino Sub-20, UNCAFut.com 
Men's U20, CFUfootball.org

Qualification
U-20 Championship Qualification
CONCACAF U-20 Championship qualification